Távora may refer to:

People
 Távora (surname)

Places
 Joaquim Távora
 Távora (Santa Maria e São Vicente)
 Távora (Tabuaço)
 Távora e Pereiro
 Santa Maria de Távora
 São Vicente de Távora

Other
 Távora affair, political scandal in 18th-century Portugal
 Marquis of Távora, Portuguese noble title
 Távora River, river in Portugal